is a Japanese gravure idol from Kanagawa Prefecture.

Career 
Important releases include:

 Koh-Boh vol. 9 Mook (Magazine-book) series with DVD (2009, December 3, Kaiōsha (Bunkasha))  
 1st DVD "PURE SMILE" (November 20, 2009, Takeshobo)
 1st Photo "AYA" (2009, October 24, Saibunkan)
 Young Magazine (2009 release on September 28)
 Sabra (2009, December 25)
 @misty (2009, August 28)

Media 

TV appearances include:
 Zenryokuzaka (Full-speed Slope) (July 27, 2010 Aug 4.24 Sun, TV Asahi)
 God-tongue (September 22, 2010, TV Tokyo) - "Geinoukai Kirejo Jyuku (The Corrently Snapping Seminar for the Idol-talent Girls)" vol. 4
 Rank Oukoku (Kingdom of Ranking) (2010, December 4, TBS)

Works 

DVDs

Photo albums

See also 
 List of Japanese gravure idols

References 
  at-misty.com

External links 
  

Japanese gravure idols
21st-century Japanese actresses
Living people
1993 births
Models from Kanagawa Prefecture